Sky Plaza (also known as The Plaza Tower) is a 34-storey, residential skyscraper, in Arena Quarter, Leeds, West Yorkshire, England.

Description
The building is the second phase of a development in Leeds city centre, consisting of 572 student apartments. It is the world's second tallest student accommodation building, after the tallest Altus House, Leeds and ahead of the third tallest being Nido Spitalfields in London.

The original planning application was an approved 26-storey scheme which was altered into the 34-storey tower. The design was submitted by Carey Jones Architects and the main contractor was Shepherd Construction. Construction took place from 2007 to 2009.

Gallery

See also 

 Architecture of Leeds

References

External links 

 Article on Skyscraper News

Residential buildings completed in 2009
Skyscrapers in Leeds
Residential skyscrapers in England